Andrew Schulze (March 8, 1896 – March 30, 1982) was a Lutheran Church–Missouri Synod (LCMS) clergyman who worked on race relations from 1924 until 1968 actively. After retirement, he continued to work on race relations. His work included partaking in the creation and founding of the Lutheran Human Relations Association of America (LHRAA), and he was its first executive secretary, whose duties including editing The Vanguard, the publication of the LHRAA.

Role in Civil Rights Movement

Andrew Schulze's final full-time job was as the Executive Secretary of the LHRAA after a long career of working in Negro Missions for the LCMS. With the creation of the LHRAA in 1954 at Valparaiso University, he promptly began working as the organization' Executive Secretary. His work involved putting together Summer Institutes, working on promoting immigration in the LCMS and in other Lutheran bodies, and editing The Vanguard.

Part of his work on integrating the LCMS involved lobbying for the Missouri Synod Pronouncement on Race Relations in 1956. Other work involved bringing speakers to the LHRAA's Summer Institute. In 1956, the speaker was Pastor Robert S. Graetz, who spoke about his participation in the Montgomery bus boycott. The purpose of these speakers was to actively work for integration.

Also in 1962, Schulze participated in the "Albany Movement" in Georgia. The main purpose of the movement was to increase black voter registration. Unfortunately this movement was not as successful as other voter movements. Therefore, Martin Luther King Jr. was calling for help from religious leaders. Concerning this event, Schulze stated, "I have been writing about this all the time, and if I can only write and I can't put my body where my words are then I am not much of a writer."

On August 26, 1962, Schulze was part of a group peacefully protesting civil rights at the Albany City Hall. They offered some prayer during their protest and had national media attention. Police Chief Pritchett arrested the religious leaders and quietly placed them in jail. In total, Andrew Schulze spent six days in jail. This addition of white clergy from the North protesting was a first for the Civil Rights Movement and led to further publication and addressing of civil rights.

References

External links 
 
Blankenbuehler, Lorenz F. and Martin W. Mueller, eds. “Progress in Race Relations Slow, Institute Reports.” The Lutheran Witness 76 (1957): 415.
Galchutt, Kathryn M. The Career of Andrew Schulze 1924-1968. Macon: Mercer University Press, 2005.
Schulze, Andrew. “Missouri Synod Pronouncement on Race Relations.” Vanguard 1–10, no. 6 (July 1956): 1–3.
Schulze, Andrew. "I was in Prison." Vanguard 1–10, no. 6 (September–October 1962): 1–2.
Schulze, Andrew. Race Against Time. Valparaiso: The Lutheran Human Relations Association of America, 1972.
Schulze, Andrew. “Synod’s Witness of the Race Issue.” The Lutheran Witness (1956): 467.
Schulze, Andrew. “Supports Negroes in Bus Boycott.” Vanguard 1–10, no. 6 (July 1956): 3–4.

20th-century American Lutheran clergy
1982 deaths
1896 births
Lutheran Church–Missouri Synod people